Amerikarate is a comic book series created by writers Brockton McKinney and Corey Kalman and illustrated by Bob's Burgers character designer, Devin Roth, and published by Action Lab Comics.

The series is a monthly ongoing and was featured as a Staff Pick from Diamond Comic Distributors Previews catalogue.

Characters
This list only includes the cast listed in the most recent issue released.
Sam Kickwell
Ric Kickwell

References

Action comics
2017 in comics